The Angoche Sultanate was established in 1485 along an archipelago off the Northern Mozambique coastline. Centered on the cities of Angoche and Moma, the Sultanate also had a number of vassal territories surrounding them. They were finally removed from power by the Portuguese colonial government in 1910.

History

The settlement of Angoche dates back to about the start of the sultanate, as one of three major Swahili settlements (other two being Sangage Sheikhdom and Sancul Sheikhdom). As one of the first settlements in Mozambique, it became a major trading centre, with important gold and ivory markets. The Sultans of Angoche expanded to rule over all the archipelago, with Angoche serving as the major city of their realm. However, for all its early trade, the city became replaced by Quelimane as a major port. The Sultanate was hurt by the settlement of a new group of people on its hinterland, who blocked access to the mainland and imposed tolls on passing caravans. During this period Angoche suffered from an economic decline, with the Sultans losing their political influence. However, the city still remained a centre for Islam and its expansion onto the mainland of Mozambique.

During the 19th Century, the Sultanate quickly supplied a growing demand for ivory, rubber and slaves. The latter became increasingly important throughout the century, as the European anti-slavery movement grew. The independence of the Sultanate from European Empires made it a focus for the slave trade. In 1847, many businesses had relocated to Angoche from cities under Portuguese control, to escape the taxes and duties imposed there.

The growing demand for slaves was the reason behind Angoche's expansion onto the mainland, where they could control the caravan routes and create their own slave bases. Musa Muhammad Sahib (who later became a sultan himself) realised this expansion of the Sultanate under the rule of Sultan Hasani Usufu. He relied on the widespread circulation of firearms to help him achieve this. Musa enslaved the Marrevoni of the interior (at the behest of one of the vassal tribes), bringing more ivory and rubber with his conquest.

In the 1860s, the Portuguese attacked the Sultanate, however their early campaign proved fruitless and they still had no direct control over Angoche. Following the death of the ruling monarch in 1877, Angoche descended into a civil war with 7 different claimants competing for power. By 1890, Mahamuieva, also known as Farelay had emerged victorious, and would rule until the end of the sultanate in 1910, when the sultanate was conquered by a well-equipped Portuguese military expedition.

Further reading 

 The Early History of the Sultanate of Angoche
 The Ascendance of Angoche

References 

Former countries in Africa
Countries in precolonial Africa
History of Mozambique
Former sultanates
1485 establishments
15th-century establishments in Africa
States and territories disestablished in 1910
States and territories established in the 1480s